Ipueiras is a municipality in the state of Tocantins in the Southern Region of Brazil.

References

Municipalities in Tocantins